Mark Sullivan is a visual effects who was nominated at the 64th Academy Awards for the film Hook in the category of Best Visual effects. His nomination was shared with Eric Brevig, Harley Jessup and Michael Lantieri.

Selected filmography

Twilight Zone: The Movie (1983)
Pee-wee's Big Adventure (1985)
The Abyss (1989)
Ghostbusters II (1989)
Indiana Jones and the Last Crusade (1989)
RoboCop 2 (1990)
Backdraft (1991)
Hook (1991)
The Rocketeer (1991)
The Mummy (1999)
Star Wars: Episode I – The Phantom Menace (1999)
Star Wars: Episode II – Attack of the Clones (2002)
The Passion of the Christ (2004)
Apocalypto (2006)
The Forbidden Kingdom (2008)
The Tourist (2010)

References

External links

Living people
Special effects people
Year of birth missing (living people)
Place of birth missing (living people)